Frank B. Zoltowski (born 1957) is an Australian amateur astronomer and prolific discoverer of minor planets who lives in Woomera, South Australia. In 1998, he was awarded a "Gene Shoemaker NEO Grant" for improved near-Earth object searches.

Zoltowski conducts these searches from his home with a charge-coupled device camera. He is a prolific discoverer of asteroids. He authored CCDTRACK, a computer program that auto-guides electronically controlled telescopes by tracking a user-selected celestial object.

He is mentioned in NASA's asteroid tracking database as an observer for asteroid . It was thought to potentially crash into Earth.

The main-belt asteroid 18292 Zoltowski, discovered at the George R. Agassiz Station of the Harvard College Observatory in 1977, was named in his honor. The naming citation was published on 9 May 2001.

List of discovered minor planets 

Frank Zoltowski is credited by the Minor Planet Center for the discovery of 228 numbered minor planets between 1997 and 2003.

See also 
 List of minor planet discoverers

References

External links 
 CCDTrack Software website, Author F. B. Zoltowski

1957 births
20th-century Australian astronomers
21st-century Australian astronomers
Discoverers of asteroids

Living people